Julia Waters Tillman (born Julia Waters on June 8, 1943, in Texas) is an American singer, best known for her backing vocals.

Julia is sister to Oren Waters, Luther Waters, and Maxine Waters Willard. Julia and Maxine Waters are sometimes referred to as "The Waters Sisters". They are featured on Michael Jackson's 1982 album Thriller, and in the documentary film 20 Feet from Stardom.

References

External links
 

Living people
Singers from Texas
American session musicians
1943 births